Stachyptilum is a genus in the family Stachyptilidae. The genus contains bioluminescent species.

References

Octocorallia genera
Bioluminescent cnidarians
Stachyptilidae